Male captus, bene detentus (wrongly captured, properly detained) is a legal doctrine, according to which the fact that a person may have been wrongly or unfairly arrested, will not prejudice a rightful detention or trial under due process. 

There is state practice in support of the doctrine, as well as contrary state practice. In one of its cases the U.S. Supreme Court held that where a person from another country is apprehended by irregular means, the right to set up as defense the unlawful manner by which he was brought to a court belongs "to the Government from whose territory he was wrongfully taken".

Further reading 
 Paulussen, C. Y. M. (2010): Male Captus Bene Detentus? Surrendering suspects to the International Criminal Court. Intersentia.

Notes 

Legal doctrines and principles
Legal rules with Latin names